Rasmus Villads Christian Ferdinand Winther (29 July 1796 – 30 December 1876), was a Danish lyric poet. 

He was born at Fensmark near Næstved, where his father was the vicar.  He went to the University of Copenhagen in 1815, and studied theology, taking his degree in 1824. He began to publish verse in 1819, but no collected volume appeared until 1828. Meanwhile, from 1824 to 1830, Winther was supporting himself as a tutor. A large inheritance from his uncle, Rasmus Winther, allowed him in 1830 to travel to Italy for a year. In 1835 a second volume of lyric poems appeared, and in 1838 a third. In 1841 King Christian VIII of Denmark appointed Winther to travel to Mecklenburg to instruct Princess Mariane, on the occasion of her betrothal to the Crown Prince of Denmark, in the Danish language. When he was over fifty, Winther married.

Further collections of lyrics appeared in 1842, 1848, 1850, 1853, 1865 and 1872.  In 1851 he, who had for most of his life been pestered by heavy debts, received a pension from the state as a poet, and for the next quarter of a century he resided mainly in Paris.

Besides the nine or ten volumes of lyrical verse mentioned above, Winther published Hjortens Flugt ("The Stag's Flight"), an epical romance in verse (1855). Taking place in 15th Century South Zealand, written in Nibelungenlied stanzas and probably inspired by Byron's Mazeppa it tells about young love, demonic forces and witchcraft with a running stag as the reappearing motive of the untamed forces of Nature. However, in the lyric intervals it is also praising the idylls and freedom of Nature. In generations it became a traditional confirmation present for Danish youths in that respect competing with Paludan-Müller’s Adam Homo.

Many of Winther’s shorter poems have won popularity and have become transformed into songs, for instance Flyv fugl, flyv – (“Fly, Bird, fly“), and some of the verses from his collection Til Een, 1842, (“For One”) a tribute to his wife. A classic is also the small humorous epic poem for children: Flugten til Amerika 1830, (Engl. Transl. The Flight to America, 1976). Besides must be mentioned In the Year of Grace a novel (1874); and other works in prose. He died in Paris, but his body was brought to Denmark, and was buried in the heart of the woods.

As a lover of Woman and Nature Winther is perhaps one of the Danish authors who is most closely connected to the concept of a romantic poet. Many later Danish lyrics have been inspired by his verses. His special ability of making Nature accompanying the action and his elegant and, compared with his time, rather sensual tributes to women was something new. Through The Stag's Flight, his main work, he has won the name of “The Singer of Zealand”.

Notes

References

 Dansk Biografisk Leksikon, vol. 15, Copenhagen 1984 (only in Danish).

External links

 Christian Winther's grave
 Christian Winther on Victor Records.
 
 
Lyrics
Christian Winther at Kalliope.
Christian Winther at Danish Wikisource.
Christian Winther at the Lied and Art Song Archive.
Christian Winther at the Archive for Danish Literature.
Children's poem 
Flugten til Amerika: book at the Internet Archive.
Flugten til Amerika: lyrics at Danish Wikisource.
Flugten til Amerika: recording 
Flugten til Amerika: translation 
Parlor song
Længsel: Danish lyrics
Længsel: English lyrics
Længsel: musical notation
Længsel on Edison Records.
Længsel sung in English by Louise Homer.
Folk song
To drosler sad på bøgekvist: lyrics
To drosler sad på bøgekvist: recording
Art song
Flyv, fugl, flyv: lyrics
Flyv, fugl, flyv: recording

1796 births
1876 deaths
19th-century Danish novelists
19th-century Danish poets
Danish expatriates in France
Danish male poets
People from Næstved Municipality
University of Copenhagen alumni
Danish male novelists
19th-century male writers
Lyric poets
Burials at Holmen Cemetery